Play-mate of the Apes is a 2002 American direct-to-DVD erotic film directed by John Bacchus. It is a parody of the Planet of the Apes media franchise and was released seven months after the Tim Burton-directed 2001 remake of the first film.

Plot
In the distant future, astronaut Gaylor and her lesbian companions crash on an alien planet. They discard their spacesuits to indulge in lesbian pleasures. Gaylor and her crew discover that the planet is dominated by an intelligent and tyrannical race of apes who enslave humans. The three astronauts are captured and imprisoned, but Commander Gaylor uses her charms to seduce both the sympathetic ape, Doctor Cornholeous and the savage Uvula.

Filming and release
The film was produced by Seduction Cinema, a division of New Jersey-based production company, E.I. Independent Cinema. Shot in New Jersey in September 2001, it was released on DVD on February 26, 2002. Since its release, it continues to air periodically on premium cable stations such as Showtime and Cinemax. In 2012, to commemorate the film's tenth anniversary, it was re-released on DVD, featuring two new commentary tracks and packaged with a comic book adaptation of the film.

Reception
The film was given 2 out of 4 by Dr. Gore's Movie Reviews.

References

External links
 
 

2002 television films
2002 films
American sex comedy films
Softcore pornography
2000s sex comedy films
American parody films
Pornographic parody films
Planet of the Apes films
2000s English-language films
2000s American films
2000s parody films